David Adam Secombe (May 25, 1827 – March 25, 1892) was a lawyer and Republican politician in Minnesota. He served as mayor of St. Anthony, as a delegate at the state's constitutional convention and in the Minnesota House of Representatives.

Life and career
Secombe was born in New Hampshire in 1827. He attended local schools and entered Dartmouth College in 1847, but left before graduating to study law under Daniel Clark. In 1851, he relocated to Minnesota and settled in St. Anthony; he was admitted to the bar the next year. He briefly worked in partnership with John W. North but later left to pursue an independent practice. Secombe remained an active lawyer in Hennepin County for the next four decades.

He was briefly active in Republican politics. In 1856 he was elected as an alderman in St. Anthony. When Alvaren Allen resigned as mayor, Secombe served out the remainder of his term. He attended Minnesota's Republican Constitutional Convention in 1858 and served one term in the Minnesota House of Representatives from 1859 to 1861. After serving briefly as Hennepin County Attorney from 1871 to 1872, he withdrew from politics to focus on his law practice.

Secombe died in Minneapolis in 1892. He is buried at Lakewood Cemetery in Minneapolis.

References

1827 births
1892 deaths
Burials at Lakewood Cemetery
Minnesota lawyers
People from Milford, New Hampshire
Minnesota city council members
Republican Party members of the Minnesota House of Representatives
19th-century American politicians
19th-century American lawyers